Lionel Cox (born 11 July 1981) is a Belgian sports shooter. He competed in the men's 50 metre rifle prone event at the 2012 Summer Olympics. He qualified as second for the final with 8 shooters with a score of 599 out of 600. He finished the final as second, winning the silver medal.

Olympic results

References

1981 births
Living people
People from Seraing
Olympic silver medalists for Belgium
Olympic medalists in shooting
Belgian male sport shooters
Olympic shooters of Belgium
Shooters at the 2012 Summer Olympics
Medalists at the 2012 Summer Olympics
Shooters at the 2015 European Games
European Games competitors for Belgium
Sportspeople from Liège Province